BPAN may refer to:

 Beta-propeller protein-associated neurodegeneration, a form of Neurodegeneration with brain iron accumulation
 Pheromone biosynthesis activating neuropeptide, a hormone found in moths